The Individual freestyle test grade I equestrian event at the 2004 Summer Paralympics was competed on 23 September. It was won by Lee Pearson MBE, representing .

Final round
23 Sept. 2004, 10:00

References

2004 Summer Paralympics events